Cornelis van Slingeland (1635 in Dordrecht – 1686 in Dordrecht), was a Dutch Golden Age painter.

According to Houbraken he was both a cook and a painter, known by the bentname "Zeehaan" (Sea-rooster, or Sea-cock) for going to Rome twice by sea. He lived in Dordrecht "by de Groothoofdspoort, over 't Ossenhoofd".

According to the RKD he was a portrait painter who buried a child in 1666 in Dordrecht, which indicated he had settled there. He ran a kitchen for feeding the poor.

He was possibly related to Pieter Cornelisz van Slingelandt. No known works survive.

References

1635 births
1686 deaths
Dutch Golden Age painters
Dutch male painters
Artists from Dordrecht
Members of the Bentvueghels